Rud-e Robat (also Romanized as Rūd-e Robāţ; also known as Robāţ) is a village in Darmian Rural District, in the Central District of Darmian County, South Khorasan Province, Iran. At the 2006 census, its population was 69, in 21 families.

References 

Populated places in Darmian County